Yinyu may refer to:
Yinyu Ye, an American theoretical computer scientist 
A number of Chinese fish dishes including egg - for example:
 yínyú jiāndàn (Silver Fish Fried Egg)
 yínyú chǎodàn (Whitebait omelette)
Yinyu Waterfall in Yushan National Park 
Two islets (Yin Yu & Yinyu Zi) in the Observation Bank of the Crescent Group of the Paracel Islands of the South China Sea